Bridgeport Center (also known as the People's Bank Building) is a continuous complex of low to mid-rise office buildings in downtown  Bridgeport, Connecticut. The complex served as the headquarters of People's United Financial, now a subsidiary of M&T Bank. It is to serve as the regional headquarters of M&T Bank in New England. It was designed by Richard Meier & Partners Architects LLP and finished construction in 1989. The complex was built in part of efforts to revitalize the city's Downtown. It is adjacent to the Barnum Museum.

The building is located at 850 Main Street on the site of the First National Bank Building, which shared the same address.

Law firm Pullman & Comley LLC also has space in the complex.

Design 
The form of the building consists of a continuous fabric of low to mid-rise office buildings. A seven-story parking garage resides on the eastern portion of the building's base, with access to the lobby atrium and elevators. The ground floor also houses a People's United Financial branch.

Tower 

An 18-story tower rises from the complex, clad with steel and granite facades. The southern face of the tower is primarily made of granite and is in the shape of a rectangular prism, with a 1x2x2 grid shape of thick granite pillars forming the tower's distinguishing roof piece. To the north of the granite portion of the tower, a wider white portion holds most of the tower's area. On the west face, this part of the building has a central curve inward. The roof of this portion contains two mechanical penthouses that are stacked on top of each other, each having a greater setback than the last.

In popular culture

 The building is featured on a plaque on Library Way in Midtown Manhattan, New York City

See also
 List of tallest buildings in Connecticut
 Barnum Museum
 Park City Plaza

References

Office buildings in Connecticut
Headquarters in the United States
Office buildings completed in 1989